The 2016 Dafabet Champion of Champions was a professional non-ranking snooker tournament that took place between 7 and 12 November 2016 at the Ricoh Arena in Coventry, England. It was the fourth staging of the tournament since it was revived in 2013. In the United Kingdom the tournament was broadcast on ITV4.

Neil Robertson was the defending champion, but he was beaten 2–4 in the Group 1 semi-final by Stuart Bingham.

Prize fund
The breakdown of prize money for 2016 is shown below:

 Winner: £100,000
 Runner-up: £50,000
 Losing semi-finalist: £25,000
 Group runner-up: £10,000
 First round losers: £7,500
 Total: £300,000

Players
Players qualified for the event by winning important tournaments since the previous Champion of Champions. Entry was guaranteed for the defending champion, winners of rankings events and winners of the following non-rankings events: 2016 Masters, 2016 Championship League and 2016 China Championship. Remaining places were then allocated to winners of European Tour events (in the order they were played) and then, if required, to  winners of the 2016 Snooker Shoot-Out, 2016 Six-red World Championship and 2016 World Seniors Championship. Ding Junhui was awarded a wildcard for being this year's World Championship runner-up, but later qualified on his own right by winning the Six-red World Championship and 2016 Shanghai Masters.

With several players winning more than one tournament, there were fewer than 16 players who qualified by winning tournaments. Remaining places were allocated to the highest ranked player, not already qualified, on the one-year ranking list. After the 2016 International Championship there had only been 14 different winners and, with only one event left, Stuart Bingham, who was 8th in the one-year ranking list, qualified at that stage. The final place was left for the winner of the 2016 China Championship, a non-ranking event. During the China Championship Marco Fu withdrew and Joe Perry, 9th on the one-year ranking list, replaced him. At that stage John Higgins was the only non-qualified player left in the China Championship and, since he was 10th on the one-year ranking list, he therefore became the final qualifier. Moreover, he subsequently went on to win the tournament by beating Ronnie O'Sullivan 10–7 in the final.

The following players qualified for the tournament:

Four players were seeded. The seedings were determined in early October. Defending champion Neil Robertson was the 1st seed, while Mark Selby and Ronnie O'Sullivan were seeded 2nd and 3rd respectively for being the winner of last season's Triple Crown events. As Robertson was seeded twice for winning the UK Championship, Shaun Murphy became the 4th seed for being the highest ranked player not seeded after the 2016 Shanghai Masters.

Main draw

Final

Century breaks

 143, 112  John Higgins
 142, 135, 125, 107, 102  Ding Junhui
 132, 124, 111  Judd Trump
 132  Stuart Bingham
 130, 130, 124, 121, 109, 101  Ronnie O'Sullivan
 116, 109, 100  Mark Allen
 113, 101  Mark Selby
 103  Martin Gould

References

External links
 

2016
2016 in snooker
2016 in English sport
Sports competitions in Coventry
2010s in Coventry
November 2016 sports events in the United Kingdom